Don King (born 1931) is an American boxing promoter.

Don King or Donald King may also refer to:
 Don King (coach) (born 1926), American football player and coach
 Don King (defensive back) (born 1964), American football player
 Don King (defensive lineman) (1929–2014), American football player
 Don King (musician) (born 1954), American singer, songwriter, guitarist, and trumpeter
 Don King (photographer) (born 1960), American photographer, cinematographer, and film director
 Don Roy King, American television director for Saturday Night Live
 Don W. King (1942–2014), American writer and gay rights activist
 Donald King (lawyer) (1911-1997), British lawyer and bureaucrat